Amathusia ochraceofusca , the pale-haired palmking, is a butterfly found in the  Indomalayan realm It belongs to the Satyrinae, a subfamily of the brush-footed butterflies.

Description

Deep indentations at veins 2, 3 and 4 but less so than Amathusia schoenbergi Male upper hindwing has  a hair pencil (scent pencil-a dorsal glandular fold or oval-shaped depression on the wing membrane covered by pencils of long hairs) .

Subspecies
A. o. ochraceofusca Sumatra, Peninsular Malaya
A. o. gabriela Fruhstorfer, 1905   Borneo

References

Amathusia (butterfly)
Butterflies described in 1888